William McCrea may refer to:

William McCrea (astronomer) (1904–1999), British astronomer and mathematician
William McCrea, Baron McCrea of Magherafelt and Cookstown (born 1948), politician from Northern Ireland